Anugerah Aidilfitri is the eleventh studio album by Malaysian pop singer-songwriter Dato' Siti Nurhaliza which was released a week before Hari Raya Aidilfitri of 2003.

Background
Anugerah Aidilfitri compiles all of Siti's hit Raya songs, including "Sesuci Lebaran", "Nazam Lebaran", and "Air Mata Syawal", all of which are composed by Pak Ngah, as well as a song by traditional composer S. Atan, "Bila Hari Raya Menjelma". Siti also sings a cover version of P. Ramlee's Raya song "Suara Takbir".

The track "Anugerah Aidilfitri" was released as the first single. It was composed by music director Pak Ngah, with lyrics by Ce'Kem of "Nirmala" fame. This was followed by two more original songs including "Mekar Hari Raya", the second track from the album, composed by Azmeer, with lyrics by Senibayan. "Meriah Suasana Hari Raya", the third single, is another typical raya song by composer Khir Rahman and lyricist Hairul Anuar Harun.

Track listing

VCD/DVD Version

Footnotes

See also
 "Hari Kemenangan", an Eid song recorded and released by Siti Nurhaliza in 2016

References

External links
 Anugerah Aidilfitri on iTunes Malaysia

2003 albums
Siti Nurhaliza albums
Malay-language albums
Malay-language video albums
Siti Nurhaliza video albums